The following is a list of stadiums in Mexico. They are ordered by capacity, which is the maximum number of spectators the stadium can accommodate. All Mexican stadiums with a current capacity of 10,000 or more are included in the list.

Notes
Tamaulipas: The halfway line of the pitch at Estadio Tamaulipas lies along the border of Tampico and Madero with the northern half of the pitch belonging to Tampico and the southern half to Madero.

Future stadiums

See also
List of football stadiums in Mexico
List of indoor arenas in Mexico
List of stadiums

References

Stadiums
Mexico